Klosters railway station may refer to one of several railway stations in Davos, Switzerland: 

Klosters Platz railway station, formerly Klosters railway station
Klosters Selfranga railway station
Klosters Dorf railway station
Baldegg Kloster railway station